Jane Hylton (16 July 1926 – 28 February 1979, born as Audrey Gwendolene Clark) was an English actress who accumulated 30 film credits, mostly in the 1940s and 1950s, before moving into television work in the latter half of her career in the 1960s and 1970s.

Career
Talent-spotted in her teens, Hylton was a product of the Rank Organisation's Company of Youth (more commonly referred to as the Rank Charm School), which took promising young actors and groomed them for a career in film. The programme turned out some genuine stars such as Dirk Bogarde and Diana Dors, but most alumni only had modest film careers, regularly employed in British films but rarely if ever receiving star-billing.  Female graduates of the programme were often referred to somewhat disparagingly as "Rank Starlets", with the implication that their purpose was merely to appear on screen and look glamorous; however, Hylton did feature in substantial acting roles with prominent billing.

Hylton's first screen appearance came in a 1946 programmer A Girl in a Million. She quickly moved on to minor roles in films produced by Gainsborough Studios (Jassy, When the Bough Breaks) and Ealing Studios (Holiday Camp, It Always Rains on Sunday), then in 1948 landed her largest role to that time, as an escaped convict's mistress in Gainsborough's My Brother's Keeper. She was cast as one of the daughters in the successful comedy Here Come the Huggetts, then in 1949 as Molly Reed in the Ealing Comedy Passport to Pimlico.

In the early 1950s, Hylton was cast in major roles in several films with a predominantly female cast and targeted at female audiences; Dance Hall (1950), It Started in Paradise (1952 – set in the world of haute couture) and 1954 women's prison drama The Weak and the Wicked. The quality of film roles offered to her then began to fall and she found herself for the rest of the decade toiling mainly in quickly-shot B-films, an exception being a prominent role in the 1960 horror film Circus of Horrors.

Hylton's first television appearance was in the starring role of Queen Guinevere in the 1956 series The Adventures of Sir Lancelot and from the early 1960s she spent her career entirely in television, where she featured in a number of one-off productions for BBC and ITV drama strands as well as appearing in series such as Dixon of Dock Green, Journey to the Unknown, The Troubleshooters and Take Three Girls. Her most identifiable TV role was Beryl Fisher, the mother of Betty Spencer (Michele Dotrice) in the BBC comedy series Some Mothers Do 'Ave 'Em.

Critical assessment
The film historians Steve Chibnall and Brian McFarlane praise her "quite unusual intensity and a real capacity for depicting working-class lives", and note her extensive B movie career in the 1950s: "Virtually everything she did is worth watching, for her if sometimes for little else." They add that each film she was in "benefits from the instinctive humanity, the sense of her characters having a past and a place in the world, which she brings to them".

Personal life
Hylton's first marriage to film producer Euan Lloyd ended in divorce, although the couple remained on good terms. The marriage produced a daughter, Rosalind Lloyd, who also became an actress; Hylton and her daughter both appeared in Lloyd's big budget 1978 mercenary drama The Wild Geese, which was Hylton's first screen role for 17 years and turned out to be the last of her career.

Hylton's second marriage to actor Peter Dyneley, whom she met on the set of Ett kunglit aventyr (Laughing in the Sunshine), made in 1956, lasted until Dyneley's death from cancer in 1977. 

Hylton, who had been diagnosed with a congenital heart defect in her late 30s, died of a heart attack in Glasgow on 28 February 1979, aged 52.

Partial filmography

 The Years Between (1946) – Minor role (uncredited)
 A Girl in a Million (1946) – Nurse
 Dear Murderer (1947) – Rita
 The Upturned Glass (1947) – Miss Marsh
 Holiday Camp (1947) – Receptionist
 Jassy (1947) – Amelia (uncredited)
 When the Bough Breaks (1947) – Maid
 It Always Rains on Sunday (1947) – Bessie, his sister
 Daybreak (1948) – Doris
 Streets Paved with Water (1947) (abandoned during filming)
 Good-Time Girl (1948) – Doris
 My Sister and I (1948) – Elsie
 My Brother's Keeper (1948) – Nora Lawrence
 Here Come the Huggetts (1948) – Jane Huggett
 Passport to Pimlico (1949) – Molly
 Dance Hall (1950) – Mary
 Out of True (1951, Short) – Molly Slade
 The Quiet Woman (1951) – Jane
 The Tall Headlines (1952) – Frankie Rackham
 It Started in Paradise (1952) – Martha Watkins
 The Weak and the Wicked (1954) – Babs Peters, inmate
 Burnt Evidence (1954) – Diana Taylor
 Secret Venture (1955) – Joan Butler
 Laughing in the Sunshine (1956) – Princess Caroline
 You Pay Your Money (1957) – Mrs. Delgado
 Dial 999 (TV series) (1958) - Ruth Harrison
 Violent Moment (1959) – Daisy Hacker
 Deadly Record (1959) – Ann Garfield
 The Manster (1959) – Linda Stanford
 Devil's Bait (1959) – Ellen Frisby
 Night Train for Inverness (1960) – Marion
 Circus of Horrors (1960) – Angela
 House of Mystery (1961) – Stella Lemming
 Bitter Harvest (1963) – Carole (uncredited)
 The Wild Geese (1978) – Mrs. Marjorie Young

References

External links
 "A new kind of happiness for Jane Hylton" 1972 interview
 

1926 births
1979 deaths
English film actresses
English television actresses
Actresses from London
20th-century English actresses